The Health Service Commissioners Act 1993 is an Act of the Parliament of the United Kingdom.

The Act consolidated previous legislation governing the posts of Health Service Commissioner for England, Scotland and Wales.

The three posts were formerly held by a single individual who also served as Parliamentary Commissioner for Administration.  However, in 2002, the post of Health Service Commissioner for Scotland was abolished and in 2003, the post of Health Service Commissioner for Wales was transferred to a separate office holder in accordance with devolution.  The Health Service Commissioner for England still retains the post of Parliamentary Commissioner for Administration and is more commonly called the Parliamentary and Health Service Ombudsman.

The Ombudsman may investigate health authorities, National Health Service trusts managing hospitals or other facilities, Primary Care Trusts, individuals undertaking medical or dental services, individuals and bodies providing ophthalmic or pharmaceutical services and individuals or bodies providing services under arrangements with the National Health Service.

Under s3(1), the Ombudsman may investigate complaints by or on behalf of any person that he has sustained injustice in consequence of the failure of or in consequence of:
 an alleged failure in a service provided by a health service body.
 an alleged failure of such a body to provide a service which it was a function of the body to provide.
 maladministration connected with any other action taken by or on behalf of such a body.
 action taken by a family health service provider who has undertaken to provide any family health services in connection with these services.
 an alleged failure in the service provided by an independent provider, an alleged failure by an independent provider to provide a service, or maladministration connected with any other action taken by an independent provider in relation to the service.

Under ss3(4)-(7), the Ombudsman may not question the merits of a decision taken without maladministration in the exercise of discretion except when the decision was taken in consequence of the exercise of clinical judgment.

Section 14(1) required that when the Ombudsman conducts an investigation, he must send a report to the interested parties, including the complainant and the body complained about.

If it appears to the Ombudsman that the person aggrieved has sustained injustice or hardship in consequence of the action of the body complained about, and the injustice or hardship has not or will not be remedied, he may lay a copy of the report before Parliament under s14(3).

The Ombudsman must lay an annual report before Parliament and may lay other reports from time to time as he sees fit under s14(4).

References 

United Kingdom Acts of Parliament 1993